Bacterial vaginosis is caused by an imbalance of the naturally occurring bacteria in the vagina.  The normally predominant species of Lactobacilli are markedly reduced. This is the list of organisms that are found in the vagina that are associated with bacterial vaginosis, an infectious disease of the vagina caused by excessive growth of specific bacteria. The census and relationships among the microbiota are altered in BV resulting in a complex bacterial milieu. Some species have been identified relatively recently. Having infections with the listed pathogens increases the risk of acquiring other sexually transmitted infections including HIV/AIDS.

Microbiota

 Actinobacteria spp
 Actinomyces naeslundii
 Aggregatibacter actinomycetemcomitans
 Anaerococcus spp
 Atopobium vaginae
 Bacteroides ureolyticus
 Bifidobacterium spp
 Clostridiales spp
 Collinsella aerofaciens
 Eggerthella lenta
 Eggerthella spp
 Eubacterium spp
 Fusobacterium nucleatum
  Gardnerella vaginalis
 Leptotrichia amnionii
 Leptotrichia spp
 Megasphaera spp
 Mobiluncus spp
 Mycoplasma hominis 
 Mycoplasma parvum
 Peptococcus spp
 Peptoniphilus spp
 Peptostreptococcus anaerobius
 Peptostreptococcus spp
 Porphyromonas gingivalis
 Prevotella bivia spp
 Prevotella disiens
 Prevotella intermedia
 Slackia spp
 Sneathia sanguinegens
 Streptococcus viridans
 Tannerella forsythia
 Treponema denticola
 Ureaplasma urealyticum 
 Veillonella parvula

References

Further reading
 Bacterial vaginosis: a review on clinial trials with probiotics (2013)

External links
 A Metagenomic Approach to Characterization of the Vaginal Microbiome Signature in Pregnancy. Kjersti Aagaard, Kevin Riehle, Jun Ma, Nicola Segata, Toni-Ann Mistretta, Cristian Coarfa, Sabeen Raza, Sean Rosenbaum, Ignatia Van den Veyver, Aleksandar Milosavljevic, Dirk Gevers, Curtis Huttenhower, Joseph Petrosino, James Versalovic. PLoS ONE volume 7, issue 6. (2012) 
 CDC
 NIH/Medline
 Pelvic Inflammatory Disease (PID; Salpingitis, Endometritis)

Inflammatory diseases of female pelvic organs
Reproductive system
Gynaecology
Sexual health
Bacterial vaginosis
Microbiomes
Mycoplasma